The 22475 / 22476 Hisar–Coimbatore AC Superfast Express (previously Bikaner–Coimbatore AC Superfast Express) is a fully air conditioned, Superfast Express train operated by the Bikaner Division of North Western Railway zone of Indian Railways.

The train connects Tamil Nadu, Kerala, Karnataka, Goa, Maharashtra, Gujarat, Rajasthan, and Haryana.

For the return journey, train numbered 22476 leaves Coimbatore Junction at 12:45 hrs on Saturdays and reaches Hisar Junction at 16:00 hrs on Mondays. This train got its LHB coach from 9 August 2018. This train is operated through Konkan Railway route. It covers distance of 2941 km.

Route & halts

 
 
 
 
  (rake reversal)

Schedule

Locomotive

Both trains are hauled by a Bhagat Ki Kothi Diesel Loco Shed-based WDP-4 / WDP-4B / WDP-4D diesel locomotive from Hisar to till Jodhpur handing over to Erode or Royapuram based WAP-7 from Jodhpur to Coimbatore.

Direction reversal

The train reverses its direction once at;
 .

References

Transport in Bikaner
Transport in Coimbatore
Rail transport in Rajasthan
Rail transport in Tamil Nadu
AC Express (Indian Railways) trains
Rail transport in Maharashtra
Rail transport in Gujarat
Rail transport in Goa
Rail transport in Karnataka
Rail transport in Kerala
Railway services introduced in 2012